Simone Hagelskjær (born 2 March 1992) is a Danish football player who plays as a defender for VSK Aarhus in Denmark top-division Elitedivisionen and has appeared for the Denmark women's national football team.

She made international debut on the Danish national team, on 10 March 2014.

Honours 
Elitedivisionen
Bronze Medalist: 2019

References

External links
 Profile at the Danish Football Union
 Simone Hagelskjær at Soccerdonna
 
 

1992 births
Living people
Danish women's footballers
Denmark women's international footballers
Women's association football midfielders
VSK Aarhus (women) players